Prince Joseph Marie Jerôme Honoré of Monaco (10 September 1763 – 28 June 1816) was the second son of Honoré III, Prince of Monaco, and Maria Caterina Brignole and the younger brother of Prince Honoré IV. Joseph served as regent of Monaco on behalf of his brother in 1814–1815.

Biography
Prince Joseph was the second son of Honoré III, Prince of Monaco, and his Genovese wife Maria Caterina Brignole-Sale. He married Françoise de Choiseul, a niece of Étienne François, duc de Choiseul, on 6 April 1782. The marriage produced three children, only one of whom left descendants. Prince Joseph's first wife was executed in July 1794.

During the French Revolution, Joseph was often absent on foreign travels in order to secure loans for his father. During the Terror of Robespierre, these foreign trips placed him under suspicion for counterrevolutionary activity. He did in fact support the royalist uprising in Vendée. This caused him to be declared a traitor in his absence, and resulted in the arrest of his wife, father, brother and sister-in-law in Paris. He lived in exile in Great Britain, and returned to France in 1795. When his brother became Prince of Monaco in 1814, but was unable to manage the affairs of state because of poor health, Joseph was appointed regent. He was replaced as regent of Monaco in 1815.

Marriages and Issue
Prince Joseph was married firstly to Marie Thérèse de Choiseul, daughter of Jacques Philippe de Choiseul, Duke of Stainville and Thérèse de Clermont d'Amboise. They had issue:
 Princess Marie Camille of Monaco (22 Apr 1784 – 8 May 1879); married René, Marquis de La Tour-du-Pin, and had issue.
 Princess Athénais of Monaco (2 June 1786 – 11 September 1860); married Auguste Le Tellier de Souvré, Marquis de Louvois, and had no issue.
 Princess Delphine of Monaco (born 22 July 1788); died young.

Prince Joseph remarried to Frances Margaret Powell, ex-wife of Robert Samuel Rainford (1780-1850) and daughter of Thomas William Powell and Frances Brewer. They had no children.

Ancestry

References

 Françoise de Bernardy, Princes of Monaco: the remarkable history of the Grimaldi family, ed. Barker, 1961

1763 births
1816 deaths
19th-century viceregal rulers
Regents of Monaco
House of Grimaldi
Monegasque princes
Nobility from Paris
Burials at the Cathedral of Our Lady Immaculate
Sons of monarchs